Jennifer LeRoy (born January 7, 1974 in Craig, Colorado) is an American model and actress. She was chosen as Playboy Playmate of the Month in February, 1993 (which made her the second Playboy Playmate with a visible tattoo on her centerfold, after Star Stowe), and has appeared in numerous Playboy videos.

She is the sister of Olympic skier, Andy LeRoy. They grew up in Steamboat Springs, Colorado with their mother. At the age of 16, Jennifer left Colorado to become a runway model around the world.

In 2005, Leroy gave birth to her daughter, Amala L. Manera.

See also 
 List of people in Playboy 1990–99

References

External links
 

American film actresses
1990s Playboy Playmates
People from Moffat County, Colorado
1974 births
Living people
Actresses from Colorado
21st-century American women